University of Tartu Viljandi Culture Academy is an Estonian institution of higher education, situated in the provincial town of Viljandi, central Estonia. The UT Viljandi Culture Academy merged with the University of Tartu in 2005. The UT VCA has been teaching professional higher education and performing applied research within information science, culture education and creative arts since 1952. The academy has about 1000 students, half of whom are open university students. The teaching and instruction are based on the continuity and sustainability of Estonian native culture enriched by new impulses which widen the notion of traditional culture. As of 2021, the Director of the institution is Juko-Mart Kõlar.

Education

The UT Viljandi Culture Academy offers undergraduate study programmes in such fields as theatre and dance arts, music, Estonian native crafts, youth work and culture management. Most programmes are 4-years (240 ECTS), professional higher education programmes (equal with BA studies). One programme (School Music) is a BA programme with 3 study years (180 ECTS).

The Academy also offers MA graduate study programmes with 2 study years (120 ECTS), in such fields as music education, traditional music.

Since 2011, UT VCA offers an International Master programme, where teaching takes place in English. MA in Sound Engineering Arts .

Departments and their specialties:

 Department of Culture Education: Leisure Time- and Culture Management;
 Department of Performing Arts: Theatre Arts, Dance Arts, Performing Arts Visual Technology;
 Department of Music: Traditional Music, Jazz Music, Music Education, Sound Engineering;
 Department of Estonian Native Crafts: Native Textile, Native Construction, Native Metalwork, Inherited Crafts.

Research and Creative studies

In the last decades, the UT VCA’s main area of research has been the humanities, but there is an increasing amount of cooperation with social, economic, technological and material sciences. The contemporary teaching methods within creative arts, non-formal education and education in arts and music are among the most covered applied research areas. The most remarkable development has taken place in the field of applied inherited crafts. In 2009 the Academy began publishing a series of academic publications, Studia Vernacula.

International cooperation

There are also various international projects in which different departments from the academy are taking part. In addition, the academy also participates in the activities of several international university networks:

 AEC the European Association of Conservatoires.
 IASJ the International Association of Schools of Jazz.
 NORDTRAD a Nord Plus network of academies and universities in the Nordic and Baltic countries offering third level education in traditional music.
 NORTEAS a Nord Plus network for Nordic and Baltic Theatre and Dance Institutions of Higher Education.
 DAMA a Nord Plus network of Dance and Media Art Schools.
 NNME a Nordic Network for Music Education.
NORDPULS a Nord Plus network of academies and universities in the Nordic and Baltic countries providing professional music training in the area of pop, jazz and related music genres.

UT VCA has signed bilateral co-operation agreement in the framework of the Erasmus+ programme with many universities (selection):

  Konservatorium Wien University
  University of Music and Performing Arts Graz
  Helsinki Metropolia University of Applied Sciences
  HUMAK University of Applied Sciences
  Jyväskylä University of Applied Sciences
  Kuopio Academy of Music and Dance
  Mikkeli University of Applied Sciences
  North Karelia University of Applied Sciences
  Seinajoki University of Applied Sciences
  Sibelius Academy
  Theatre Academy of Finland
  Turku University of Applied Sciences, Arts Academy
  Palucca School of Dance
  Iceland Academy of Arts
  Vilniaus kolegija/University of Applied Sciences
  Klaipeda University
  Art Academy of Latvia
  Norwegian Academy of Music
  Telemark University College
  Instituto Politecnico de Lisboa, Escola Superior de Dança
  Academy of Music and Drama Göteborg University
  Karlstad University, Ingesund College of Music
  Malmö Academy of Music, Lund University
  Royal College of Music in Stockholm
  Cumhuriyet University
  University of Chester

History

In Tallinn in the year 1952, the Tallinn Culture School (est: Tallinna Kultuurharidusala Kool ) – later the Tallinn School of Cultural Education  (Tallinna Kultuurharidustöö Kool ) was founded, where specialists are  educated for libraries and community centres.
By 1960, the school building in Tallinn has become too small and the Tallinn School of Cultural Education  is transferred to Viljandi. In 1978, the school takes its new name, Viljandi Culture School (Viljandi Kultuurikool).
In the autumn of 1991, the educational institution  is  reorganised into Viljandi Culture College (Viljandi Kultuurikolledž), providing applied higher education within different areas of culture. In 2003, the Viljandi Culture College becomes the Viljandi Culture Academy and in 2005 it joins the University of Tartu.

Buildings

Main Building

The oldest part of the building was built in 1860 as a town-palace by count Theodor von Helmersen, the owner of Karula manor house in the north of Viljandi and was registered as a protected architectural monument in 1998.

Music House

The Music House of UT VCA was opened in December 2005. The building is home to the whole music department of the academy, including the chairs of traditional music, classical- and church-music, jazz music, and school music. The music house is of importance not only for the academy but for the whole city. The renovated building is situated in the heart of Viljandi city as well as the main building. Both buildings contribute to the idea of a culture district in the city centre. The Music house, Carl Robert Jakobson street 14, is located at the corner of Carl Robert Jakobson- and Lossi street, in the historical monument preservation zone of Viljandi's old town. The house was built in 1888 in historicist style as a two-storey stone dwelling house, which belonged in the beginning to the Viljandi governor of the Russian tsar, baron von Wolff.
In 1917 the building hosted the Viljandi war-revolution committee. Later it was home to the staff of the Sakala partisan battalion and in soviet time it was used as a war-commissariat. After Estonia restored its independence in the beginning of the 1990s, the building was used as the Viljandi department of Estonia's state-defence. The building has been protected as an architectural monument since 1964.

Traditions and main events

 The Viljandi Guitar Festival this international guitar festival has taken place in the third week of September since 2008.
 The Student Theatre Festival TTP this international three-day festival started in 2003.
 School Jazz = Jazz School a three-day workshop seminar for young students of jazz music from all over Estonia. Young people are instructed by the best professional jazz musicians and there is a joint open concert for all participants every evening.
 Dance Week every year the world celebrates the International Dance Day on 29 April and the academy isno exception. Since 2010 the celebration is organized as a week full of dance performances, workshops, films and open courses in Viljandi’s secondary schools and in the academy led by students, teachers and alumni.
 Weekly jazz nights the Jazz Club gatherings see performances by both aspiring and famous jazz musicians.
 Culture Wednesdays performance events organised monthly by students, alumni and guests of the Performing Arts Department.
 Public Lecture Series "Own Culture" is annually organised lecture series on Estonian heritage culture for the local community.

Product development
Incubator of Creative Industries in Viljandi County - The academy also heads a project with the aim of developing an Incubator of Creative Industries. The Incubator has two different direction or centers: textile - handicraft and metal. The first compartment opened its doors in the academic year 2010-2011.

See also
 Narva College of the University of Tartu
 Viljandi Folk Music Festival

References

External links
 University of Tartu Viljandi Culture Academy - website
 University of Tartu - website
 University of Tartu Study information system
 Estonian Traditional Music Center
 Viljandi Folk Music Festival - website
 Estonian Creative Agency
 'Viljandi city' - Official website
 Viljandi County - Official website

University of Tartu
Viljandi